The Fifth Estate is most strongly associated with bloggers, journalists, hacktivists, and media outlets that operate outside of the mainstream media.

Fifth Estate may also refer to:
 The Fifth Estate (TV series), a Canadian investigative newsmagazine (1975–present)
 The Fifth Estate (film), a 2013 movie about WikiLeaks
 Fifth Estate (periodical), a US anarchist periodical and former Detroit underground newspaper
 The Fifth Estate (band), a US band
 Fifth Estate Theatre Company, a Scottish theatre company
 Lord High Commissioner to the Parliament of Scotland, the fifth Estates of Scotland

See also
Estates of the realm
Fifth column
Fifth power
Fourth Estate